The Zwönitz is a river of Saxony, Germany, being the right source river of the Chemnitz, which it joins near the city Chemnitz.

See also
List of rivers of Saxony

Rivers of Saxony
Rivers of the Ore Mountains
Rivers of Germany